Amejjaou (Amazigh: Amejjaw, ⴰⵎⴻⵊⵊⴰⵡ, Arabic:   ا مجو) is a commune in Driouch Province, Oriental, Morocco. At the time of the 2004 census, the commune had a total population of 5977 people living in 1038 households.

References

Populated places in Driouch Province
Rural communes of Oriental (Morocco)